Ardalion Ardalionovich Rastov (17 June 1926 in Moscow, USSR – 31 July 2012 in Moscow, Russia) was a Soviet engineer and chief designer of Kub and Buk surface-to-air missile systems.

Biography 
Rastov studied radio-electronic engineering at Moscow Energy Institute, graduating in 1949. Since 1948 he worked for NII-17 and in 1953 was appointed a deputy to chief designer of Izumrud-2 radar for MiG-17 and MiG-19. Later, in 1955, he was moved to Zhukovskiy division of NII-17, currently known as Tikhomirov NIIP, where he directed testing of the K-5 air-to-air missile for MiG-17 and MiG-19.

Since 1957, Rastov worked as a chief designer of Kub missile system (1967—1983) which has successful military service record (more than 500 systems produced). Being for the 16 years a chief designer he made 7 modifications of Kub design. He authored numerous research papers and inventions in aircraft and missile systems.

Awards 
 Hero of Socialist Labour (1983)
 Lenin Prize (1972)
 USSR State Prize (1980)
 Order of Lenin (1983)
 Order of the October Revolution (1971)
 Order of the Red Banner of Labour (1957)

References

External links
  by Prof. Anatoly Kanashchenkov and Alexander Osokin
 Vyacheslav Abanin, Yevgeny Pigin, Ardalion Rastov Rebirth of Kub, Military Parade, 1998.

1926 births
2012 deaths
Heroes of Socialist Labour
Soviet inventors
Soviet engineers
Tikhomirov Scientific Research Institute of Instrument Design employees